Lichtervelde is a municipality located in the Belgian province of West Flanders. The municipality comprises only the town of Lichtervelde. On January 1, 2006 Lichtervelde had a total population of 8,400. The total area is 25.93 km² which gives a population density of 324 inhabitants per km². The church is 64 m high. In this town the inventor Charles Joseph Van Depoele was born.

References

External links

 - Available only in Dutch

Municipalities of West Flanders